Kiekko-Laser were a Finnish ice hockey club from Oulu, Finland. They played in the country's second-tier league, Mestis, after winning a qualification round against RoKi in 2010.

On December 5, 2011 however, the club announced its bankruptcy and dissolved its team.

Coaching 
Head coach Mikko Manner
Coach Teemu Käyhkö
Goalkeeper coach Marko Hilli

References

External links
 Kiekko-Laser official website

Mestis teams
2005 establishments in Finland
2011 disestablishments in Finland
Ice hockey clubs established in 2005
Ice hockey clubs disestablished in 2011